Nurri is a comune (municipality) in the Province of South Sardinia in the Italian region Sardinia, located about 60 km north of Cagliari. As of 31 December 2004, it had a population of 2,385 and an area of 73.9 km².

Nurri borders the following municipalities: Esterzili, Isili, Mandas, Orroli, Sadali, Serri, Siurgus Donigala, Villanova Tulo.

Demographic evolution

References 

Cities and towns in Sardinia